Miss America 2014, the 87th Miss America pageant was held at the Boardwalk Hall in Atlantic City, New Jersey Sunday, September 15, 2013. Miss America 2013, Mallory Hagan crowned the winner, Miss New York, Nina Davuluri, who served as Miss America until September 14, 2014.

Overview

Previously held in the month of January in the Las Vegas Strip's Theatre for the Performing Arts (Planet Hollywood Resort and Casino), the Miss America Pageant returned to both its original location and September broadcast after nine years. Prior to the pageant, the partially restored Boardwalk Hall Auditorium Organ was played for the first time in more than 40 years. The program was co-hosted by Chris Harrison and Lara Spencer and was broadcast live on ABC. The panel of celebrity judges for the top 15 finalists were: Deidre Downs Gunn, Carla Hall, Barbara Corcoran, Amar'e Stoudemire, Lance Bass, Joshua Bell, and Mario Cantone.

In the final moments of the pageant, Miss California Crystal Lee and Miss New York Nina Davuluri were the last contestants left on the stage. They were approached by co-host Lara Spencer who asked how they were feeling at that moment. Davuluri stated that she and Lee were "both so proud. We’re making history right here, standing here as Asian-Americans.” However, shortly after Davuluri was crowned Miss America 2014, xenophobic and racist comments relating the proximity of the event date to the nine-eleven anniversary and to anti-Indian sentiment appeared in American social media. News agencies cited tweets that misidentified her as Muslim or Arab, associated her with groups such as Al-Qaeda, and questioned why she was chosen over Miss Kansas Theresa Vail. Davuluri said that she was prepared for the social media response because "as Miss New York, I was called a terrorist and very similar remarks."  Davuluri is the second Miss Syracuse to win the title after Miss New York 1983, Vanessa Lynn Williams who was the first African American winner and Miss America 1984. Both Davuluri and Williams won when the pageant was held in Atlantic City and both faced a backlash over their respective wins. In addition, Congressperson Grace Meng compared Davuluri to Miss New York 1945, Bess Myerson (the first and to date only Jewish-American winner and Miss America 1945) who also faced bigotry during her time as Miss America.

Miss Kansas Theresa Vail  Vail denounced this response  on her blog and in interviews.  In addition, Vail, herself, was the first contestant to display tattoos in the swimsuit competition (the United States Army Dental Command insignia on her left shoulder and the Serenity Prayer along her right side). Nicole Kelly, Miss Iowa, became the first contestant born without part of one arm (her left forearm) and Miss Florida, Myrrhanda Jones, won the preliminary talent competition for her baton twirling routine in the week prior to the Miss America 2014 pageant, despite suffering a torn ACL and MCL in rehearsal just a few hours prior to her scheduled performance. During Miss America 2014, she performed with a decorated leg brace.

Results

Placements

* – America's Choice

Order of announcements

Top 15

Top 12

Top 10

Top 5

Awards

Preliminary awards

Quality of Life awards

Duke of Edinburgh awards

Other awards

Contestants

Video clips
 Groundbreaking Miss America Winner Miss New York Takes Home Pageant Crown – ABC News, September 16, 2013
 "After Defending Miss America From Racial Comments, George Takei Meets Nina Davuluri For First Time" – ABC News, September 18, 2013 (George Takei, Star Trek's Sulu).
 "Miss America 2014: How I Survived the Hate" – Bloomberg News, September 20, 2013.
 #StandWithNina: Duke Stands with Miss America – Duke University

References

External links
 Miss America official website

2014
2013 in the United States
2014 beauty pageants
2013 in New Jersey
September 2013 events in the United States
Events in Atlantic City, New Jersey